The Blackburn TB (for "Twin Blackburn") was a long-range twin-engined anti-Zeppelin seaplane. It was Blackburn's first multi-engine aircraft to fly.

Design and development
The first attacks by German bombing airships on the United Kingdom in the winter of 1914–15 resulted in the British Admiralty issuing a requirement for a two-seat aircraft with long endurance to attack Zeppelins by dropping incendiary Ranken darts onto the airships in the hope of igniting their gas envelopes, with an order for nine Blackburn TBs being placed in March 1915.

The TB was a seaplane with twin fuselages, situated 10 ft (3.35 m) apart, with the pilot in one fuselage and the observer in the other, having no means of communication other than hand signals. Each of the twin fuselages was a wooden structure with fabric covering, with a tractor engine in front of each fuselage. It had fabric-covered, wooden unstaggered, unswept and unequal-span wings. The upper wing extension was wire braced to steel pylons above the wing. The Blackburn had ailerons on the upper wings only.

Although it was intended that the TB would be powered by two 150 hp (112 kW) Smith Static radial engines, which promised low weight and good fuel consumption, these proved to be unsatisfactory, and 100 hp (75 kW) Gnome Monosoupape 9 Type B-2 had to be substituted, this allowing the first aircraft to fly in August 1915.

Testing showed that the two Gnome engines gave insufficient power, with the aircraft being unable to climb above 8,000 ft (2,438 m) carrying the required three canisters of 24 1 lb (.5 kg) Ranken darts. The weapon load was therefore reduced to two canisters.

The ninth (and final) TB was fitted with 110 hp (80 kW) Clerget engines with the hope of improving performance. This modification was found to have little effect.

Operational history
Seven TBs were delivered to the Royal Naval Air Service. They did not see much action, four serving for a short time at RNAS Killingholme in 1917. All seven, together with the remaining two that were held in store, were broken up in 1917.

Operators

Royal Naval Air Service

Specifications (TB)

References

Sources

External links

Blackburn T.B. at the British Aircraft Directory

Twin Blackburn
1910s British fighter aircraft
Floatplanes
Twin-fuselage aircraft
Rotary-engined aircraft
Biplanes
Aircraft first flown in 1915
Twin piston-engined tractor aircraft